David Perry Rubincam, Ph.D. (born February 27, 1947) is an American geophysicist with specialties in solid-earth geophysics, planetary geodynamics and celestial mechanics. He has worked as a civilian scientist for the National Aeronautics and Space Administration since 1978. The main-belt asteroid 9921 Rubincam was named in his honor.

Education 

He received a B.S. in Physics (1970), M.S. in Physics (1972), and Ph.D. in Physics (1973) from the University of Maryland, College Park.

Professional career 

From 1974-1976 he served as a Resident Research Associate at the National Academy of Sciences and National Research Council.

From 1976-1978 he served as Lead Analyst in Geophysics at Wolf Research and Development Group, EG&G, Inc.

From 1978 to present, he has served as a Geophysicist in the Laboratory for Terrestrial Physics, National Aeronautics and Space Administration (NASA), Goddard Space Flight Center in Greenbelt, Maryland. He studies secular effects in the solar system such as tidal friction, the Yarkovsky effect, and the Yarkovsky–O'Keefe–Radzievskii–Paddack effect (YORP) effect. One of his many contributions while at NASA was conducting research to understand the dynamics of orbital decay of artificial Earth satellites. Current interests include asteroids and asteroid pairs.

Society memberships 

Rubincam is a member of the American Geophysical Union and the American Association for the Advancement of Science.

Bibliography 

 2000 "Dynamical Evolution of Main Belt Meteoroids: Numerical Simulations Incorporating Planetary Perturbations and Yarkovsky Thermal Forces," W. F. Bottke, D. P. Rubincam, and J. A. Burns, Icarus, 145, 301-331.
 1999 "Mars Secular Obliquity Change Due to Water Ice Caps," J. Geophys. Res., 104, 30,765-30,771.
 1998 "The Incredible Shrinking Tropics," D. P. Rubincam, B. F. Chao, and B. G. Bills, Sky & Telescope, 95, [6], 36-38 (June).
 1998 "Yarkovsky Thermal Drag on Small Asteroids and Mars-Earth Delivery," J. Geophys. Res., 103, 1725-1732.
 1997 "Tidal Friction," in ENCYCLOPEDIA OF PLANETARY SCIENCES, edited by J. H. Shirley and R. W. Fairbridge, Chapman & Hall, New York, pp. 825–828.
 1995 ""Has Climate Changed the Earth's Tilt?" Paleoceanography, 10, 365-372.
 1995 "America's Foremost Early Astronomer," D.P. Rubincam and M. Rubincam, Sky & Telescope, 89, [5], 38-41 (May).
 1995 "Asteroid Orbit Evolution Due to Thermal Drag," J. Geophys. Res., 100, 1585- 1594.
 1994 "Isolation in Terms of Earth's Orbital Parameters," Theor. Appl. Climatol., 48, 195-20
 1993 "The Obliquity of Mars and "Climate Friction," J. Geophys. Res., 98, 10, 827-10,832.
 1993 "The Night the Titanic Went Down," D.P. Rubincam and D.D. Rowlands, Sky & Telescope, 86, [4], 79-83 (October).
 1990 "Mars: Change in Axial Tilt Due to Climate?" Science, 248, 720-721.
 1989 "The Gravitational Field of Phobos," B.F. Chao and D.P. Rubincam, Geophys. Res. Letters, 16, 859-862.
 1987 "LAGEOS Orbit Decay due to Infrared Radiation from Earth", J. Geophys. Res., 92, 1287-1294.
 1984 "Postglacial Rebound Observed by Lageos and the Effective Viscosity of the Lower Mantle," J. Geophys. Res., 89, 1077-1087.
 1979 "Gravitational Potential Energy of the Earth: A Spherical Harmonic Approach," J. Geophys. Res., 84, 6219-6225. A284, 485-494.
 1975 "Tidal Friction and the Early History of the Moon's Orbit," J. Geophys. Res., 80, 1537-1548.

References
 

1947 births
Living people
American geophysicists
University of Maryland, College Park alumni